Charter Schools USA (CSUSA) is a for-profit education management organization in the United States.  It operates eighty-seven schools in seven states including sixty one charter schools in Florida. In 2019, Charter Schools USA managed charter schools enrolling approximately 70,000 students on a vendor operated school basis.

CSUSA management-run schools are tuition-free to the parent. Students must wear uniforms and parental involvement is required. Teachers are paid for performance and teach a standard curriculum that includes music, art, sciences and customary classes.  Charter Schools USA manages every aspect of the program from marketing for new students, teacher recruitment, curriculum development, equipment and book ordering to financial management and oversight.

History

CSUSA was founded in 1997 by Jonathan Hage, a former U.S. Army Green Beret and a champion of Education Reform and School Choice. Jon Hage was named Floridian of the Year by Florida Trend magazine in 2013 and 2019.

CSUSA is the first education management company to earn corporation system-wide accreditation through AdvancED. CSUSA shares its headquarters address with Florida Charter Educational Foundation, the holder of the charter for six of CSUSA's schools.

Affiliations

Charter Schools USA aligns with a number of associations and organizations in the quest to provide quality education for all students via education reform. Some of the quality educational reform organizations that CSUSA aligns with are:

Red Apple Development, LLC
Florida Charter School Alliance
National Alliance for Public Charter Schools
National Association of Charter School Authorizers
The Center for Education Reform
Governing Boards

Florida

Aventura City of Excellence School
Bonita Springs Charter School
Canoe Creek Charter Academy
Coral Springs Charter School
Clay Charter Academy
Creekside Charter Academy
Don Soffer Aventura High School
Downtown Miami Charter School
Duval Charter Scholars Academy
Duval Charter School at Arlington
Duval Charter High School at Baymeadows 
Duval Charter School at Baymeadows 
Duval Charter School at Flagler Center
Duval Charter School at Mandarin
Duval Charter School at Southside
Duval Charter School at Westside
Four Corners Charter School
Four Corners Upper School
G-Star School of the Arts
Gateway Charter High School
Gateway Charter School
Governors Charter Academy
Henderson Hammock Charter School
Hollywood Academy of Arts & Science
 League Academy
Keys Gate Charter School
Keys Gate Charter High School
Manatee Charter School
Mid Cape Global Academy
North Broward Academy of Excellence
Palms West Charter School
PM Wells Charter Academy
Renaissance Charter School at Central Palm
Renaissance Charter School at Chickasaw Trail
Renaissance Charter School at Cooper City
Renaissance Charter School at Coral Springs
Renaissance Charter School at Cypress
Renaissance Charter School at Goldenrod
Renaissance Charter School at Hunter’s Creek
Renaissance Charter School at Palms West
Renaissance Charter School at Pembroke Pines
Renaissance Charter School at Pines
Renaissance Charter School at Plantation
Renaissance Charter School at Poinciana
Renaissance Charter School of Saint Lucie
Renaissance Charter School at Summit
Renaissance Charter School at Tapestry
Renaissance Charter School at Tradition
Renaissance Charter School at University
Renaissance Charter School at Wellington
Renaissance Charter School at West Palm Beach
Renaissance Charter Elementary School at Doral
Renaissance Charter Middle School at Doral
Six Mile Charter Academy
Southshore Charter Academy
Union Park Charter Academy
Waterset Charter School
Winthrop Charter School
Winthrop College Preparatory Academy
Woodmont Charter School

Georgia
Cherokee Charter Academy
Coweta Charter Academy

Illinois
CICS Larry Hawkins
CICS Lloyd Bond
CICS Longwood
CICS Loomis Primary

Indiana

Indianapolis
CSUSA was nominated by the state to turn over three failing schools in Indianapolis. a first-in-the-nation type project. The three schools Thomas Carr Howe Community High School, Emmerich Manual High School, and Emma Donnan Middle School. The schools are now given over on a performance contract, which grants the operator, Charter Schools USA, four years to improve.

The turnaround process was first put into motion by a 1999 law, which said schools with student standardized test scores in the lowest category for five straight years could face intervention from the State Board of Education.

Emma Donnan Elementary and Middle School
Emmerich Manual High School
Thomas Carr Howe Community High School

Louisiana
Acadiana Renaissance Charter Academy
Baton Rouge Charter Academy at Mid City
Iberville Charter Academy
Lake Charles Charter Academy
Lake Charles College Prep
Louisiana Renaissance Charter Academy
Magnolia School of Excellence
South Baton Rouge Charter Academy
Southwest Louisiana Charter Academy

Michigan
Success Mile Charter Academy

North Carolina
Cabarrus Charter Academy
Cardinal Charter Academy
Langtree Charter Academy
Langtree Charter Upper School
Kannapolis Charter Academy
Iredell Charter Academy
Indian Trail Union Preparatory Academy

South Carolina
Berkeley Preparatory Academy
Mevers School of Excellence

References

Charter management organizations